Calvary Episcopal Church is a Gothic Revival style chapel dating to the pioneer days of Golden, Colorado, United States.  It is the oldest continuously used Episcopal church in Colorado, and is listed on the National Register of Historic Places.

History

The congregation of Calvary Episcopal Church was begun by the Episcopal missionary Bishop George Maxwell Randall, who later would establish the Colorado School of Mines.  This chapel, built upon land donated by William A.H. Loveland, was constructed in 1867-68, and has been in use by the congregation ever since.  It was designed by a member of the original church vestry, and is the earliest known work constructed by prominent regional builder John H. Parsons.  Its interior woodwork, styled like that of Anglican churches, was carved by Robert Millikin and Woods.  The church bell was given to the congregation in 1870 by the wife of George A. Jarvis, whom Jarvis Hall college was named after.  Calvary's baptismal font was carved by George Morrison, for whom Morrison, Colorado was named.  Upon the beloved bishop Randall's death in 1873, the congregation pledged to preserve this chapel as a monument to his service to Colorado.  Several additions have since been built to the structure, including its Guild Hall (1902), projecting chancel (1909), and classroom addition (1954).  The original chapel has been restored in an ongoing project from the 1990s-2000s.  It is listed on the Golden, Colorado and National historic registers.  Noted parishioners of Calvary have included George West, Edward L. Berthoud, and the Coors family, of whom the brewery's founder donated the church pews.

See also

National Register of Historic Places listings in Jefferson County, Colorado

External links

Calvary Episcopal Church

Episcopal church buildings in Colorado
Buildings and structures in Golden, Colorado
Churches on the National Register of Historic Places in Colorado
National Register of Historic Places in Jefferson County, Colorado